Afghanistan, officially the Islamic Emirate of Afghanistan, is a landlocked country located at the crossroads of Central Asia and South Asia. Referred to as the Heart of Asia, it is bordered by Pakistan to the east and south, Iran to the west, Turkmenistan to the northwest, Uzbekistan to the north, Tajikistan to the northeast, and China to the northeast and east. Occupying  of land, the country is predominantly mountainous with plains in the north and the southwest, which are separated by the Hindu Kush mountain range. Kabul is the country's largest city and serves as its capital. , Afghanistan's population is 40.2 million (officially estimated to be 32.9 million), composed of ethnic Pashtuns, Tajiks, Hazaras, Uzbeks, Turkmens, Qizilbash, Aimak, Pashayi, Baloch, Pamiris, Nuristanis, and others.

Human habitation in Afghanistan dates back to the Middle Paleolithic era, and the country's strategic location along the historic Silk Road has led it to being described, picturesquely, as the ‘roundabout of the ancient world’. Popularly referred to as the graveyard of empires, the land has historically been home to various peoples and has witnessed numerous military campaigns, including those by the Persians, Alexander the Great, the Maurya Empire, Arab Muslims, the Mongols, the British, the Soviet Union, and most recently by a US-led coalition. Afghanistan also served as the source from which the Greco-Bactrians and the Mughals, amongst others, rose to form major empires. The various conquests and periods in both the Iranian and Indian cultural spheres made the area a center for Zoroastrianism, Buddhism, Hinduism, and later Islam throughout history.

The modern state of Afghanistan began with the Durrani dynasty in the 18th century, with the Durrani Afghan Empire being formed by Ahmad Shah Durrani. The Durrani Empire led conquests in which, at its peak, encompassed land that spanned from eastern Iran to northern India. However,  that Dost Mohammad Khan laid the foundations of the first modern Afghan state. Following the Durrani Empire's decline and the death of Ahmad Shah Durrani and Timur Shah, it was divided into multiple smaller independent kingdoms, including but not limited to Herat, Kandahar and Kabul. Afghanistan would be reunited in the 19th century after seven decades of civil war from 1793 to 1863, with wars of unification led by Dost Mohammad Khan from 1823 to 1863, where he conquered the independent principalities of Afghanistan under the Emirate of Kabul. Dost Mohammad died in 1863, days after his last campaign to unite Afghanistan, and Afghanistan was consequently thrown back into civil war with fighting amongst his successors. During this time, Afghanistan became a buffer state in the Great Game between the British Empire (in British-ruled India) and the Russian Empire. From India, the British attempted to subjugate Afghanistan but were repelled in the First Anglo-Afghan War. However, the Second Anglo-Afghan War saw a British victory and the successful establishment of British political influence over Afghanistan. Following the Third Anglo-Afghan War in 1919, Afghanistan became free of foreign political hegemony, and emerged as the independent Kingdom of Afghanistan in June 1926 under Amanullah Khan. This monarchy lasted almost half a century, until Zahir Shah was overthrown in 1973, following which the Republic of Afghanistan was established.

Since the late 1970s, Afghanistan's history has been dominated by extensive warfare, including coups, invasions, insurgencies, and civil wars. The conflict began in 1978 when a communist revolution established a socialist state, and subsequent infighting prompted the Soviet Union to invade Afghanistan in 1979. Mujahideen fought against the Soviets in the Soviet–Afghan War and continued fighting amongst themselves following the Soviets' withdrawal in 1989. The Islamic fundamentalist Taliban controlled most of the country by 1996, but their Islamic Emirate of Afghanistan received little international recognition before its overthrow in the 2001 US invasion of Afghanistan. The Taliban returned to power in 2021 after capturing Kabul and overthrowing the government of the Islamic Republic of Afghanistan, thus bringing an end to the 2001–2021 war. Although initially claiming it would form an inclusive government for the country, in September 2021 the Taliban re-established the Islamic Emirate of Afghanistan with an interim government made up entirely of Taliban members. The Taliban government remains internationally unrecognized.

Afghanistan is rich in natural resources, including lithium, iron, zinc, and copper. It is also the world's largest producer of opium, second largest producer of cannabis, and third largest of both saffron and cashmere. The country is a member of the South Asian Association for Regional Cooperation and a founding member of the Organization of Islamic Cooperation. Due to the effects of war in recent decades, the country has dealt with high levels of terrorism, poverty, and child malnutrition. Afghanistan's economy is the world's 96th-largest, with a gross domestic product (GDP) of $72.9 billion by purchasing power parity. However, Afghanistan remains among the world's least developed countries, ranking 180th in the Human development Index, while its per capita GDP (PPP) ranks 169th out of 186 countries .

Etymology 

Some scholars suggest that the root name Afghān is derived from the Sanskrit word Aśvakan, which was the name used for ancient inhabitants of the Hindu Kush. Aśvakan literally means "horsemen", "horse breeders", or "cavalrymen" (from aśva, the Sanskrit and Avestan words for "horse"). However, others such as Ibrahim Khan have contended that the word Afghan comes from Bactrian.

Historically, the ethnonym Afghān was used to refer to ethnic Pashtuns. The Arabic and Persian form of the name, Afġān, was first attested in the 10th-century geography book Hudud al-'Alam. The last part of the name, "-stan", is a Persian suffix meaning "place of". Therefore, "Afghanistan" translates to "land of the Afghans", or "land of the Pashtuns" in a historical sense. According to the third edition of the Encyclopedia of Islam:

The term "Afghanistan" first appeared in 1855, during the reign of Dost Mohammad Khan.

Ancient history 

Many empires and kingdoms have also risen to power in Afghanistan, such as the Greco-Bactrians, Indo-Scythians, Kushans, Kidarites, Hephthalites, Alkhons, Nezaks, Zunbils, Turk Shahis, Hindu Shahis, Lawiks, Saffarids, Samanids, Ghaznavids, Ghurids, Khaljis, Kartids, Lodis, Surs, Mughals, and finally, the Hotak and Durrani dynasties, which marked the political origins of the modern state. Throughout millennia several cities within the modern day Afghanistan served as capitals of various empires, namely, Bactra (Balkh), Alexandria on the Oxus (Ai-Khanoum), Kapisi, Sigal, Kabul, Kunduz, Zaranj, Firozkoh, Herat, Ghazna (Ghazni), Binban (Bamyan), and Kandahar.

The country has been home to various peoples through the ages, among them the ancient Iranian peoples who established the dominant role of Indo-Iranian languages in the region. At multiple points, the land has been incorporated within vast regional empires; among them the Achaemenid Empire, the Macedonian Empire, the Maurya Empire, and the Islamic Empire. For its success in resisting foreign occupation during the 19th and 20th centuries, Afghanistan has been called the "graveyard of empires", though it is unknown who coined the phrase.

Prehistory and antiquity

Excavations of prehistoric sites suggest that humans were living in what is now Afghanistan at least 50,000 years ago, and that farming communities in the area were among the earliest in the world. An important site of early historical activities, many believe that Afghanistan compares to Egypt in terms of the historical value of its archaeological sites.

Ancient era

Archaeological exploration done in the 20th century suggests that the geographical area of Afghanistan has been closely connected by culture and trade with its neighbors to the east, west, and north. Artifacts typical of the Paleolithic, Mesolithic, Neolithic, Bronze, and Iron Ages have been found in Afghanistan. Urban civilization is believed to have begun as early as 3000 BCE, and the early city of Mundigak (near Kandahar in the south of the country) was a center of the Helmand culture. More recent findings established that the Indus Valley Civilization stretched up towards modern-day Afghanistan, making the ancient civilization today part of Pakistan, Afghanistan, and India. In more detail, it extended from what today is northwest Pakistan to northwest India and northeast Afghanistan. An Indus Valley site has been found on the Oxus River at Shortugai in northern Afghanistan. There are several smaller IVC colonies to be found in Afghanistan as well. An Indus Valley site has been found on the Oxus River at Shortugai in northern Afghanistan, shows Afghanistan to have been a part of Indus Valley Civilization.

After 2000 BCE, successive waves of semi-nomadic people from Central Asia began moving south into Afghanistan; among them were many Indo-European-speaking Indo-Iranians. These tribes later migrated further into South Asia, Western Asia, and toward Europe via the area north of the Caspian Sea. The region at the time was referred to as Ariana.

By the middle of the 6th century BCE, the Achaemenids overthrew the Medes and incorporated Arachosia, Aria, and Bactria within its eastern boundaries. An inscription on the tombstone of Darius I of Persia mentions the Kabul Valley in a list of the 29 countries that he had conquered. The region of Arachosia, around Kandahar in modern-day southern Afghanistan, used to be primarily Zoroastrian and played a key role in the transfer of the Avesta to Persia and is thus considered by some to be the "second homeland of Zoroastrianism".

Alexander the Great and his Macedonian forces arrived in Afghanistan in 330 BCE after defeating Darius III of Persia a year earlier in the Battle of Gaugamela. Following Alexander's brief occupation, the successor state of the Seleucid Empire controlled the region until 305 BCE when they gave much of it to the Maurya Empire as part of an alliance treaty. The Mauryans controlled the area south of the Hindu Kush until they were overthrown in about 185 BCE. Their decline began 60 years after Ashoka's rule ended, leading to the Hellenistic reconquest by the Greco-Bactrians. Much of it soon broke away from them and became part of the Indo-Greek Kingdom. They were defeated and expelled by the Indo-Scythians in the late 2nd century BCE.

The Silk Road appeared during the first century BCE, and Afghanistan flourished with trade, with routes to China, India, Persia and north to the cities of Bukhara, Samarkand and Khiva in present-day Uzbekistan. Goods and ideas were exchanged at this center point, such as Chinese silk, Persian silver and Roman gold, while the region of present Afghanistan was mining and trading lapis lazuli stones mainly from the Badakhshan region.

During the first century BCE, the Parthian Empire subjugated the region but lost it to their Indo-Parthian vassals. In the mid-to-late first century CE the vast Kushan Empire, centered in Afghanistan, became great patrons of Buddhist culture, making Buddhism flourish throughout the region. The Kushans were overthrown by the Sassanids in the 3rd century CE, though the Indo-Sassanids continued to rule at least parts of the region. They were followed by the Kidarites who, in turn, was replaced by the Hephthalites. They were replaced by the Turk Shahi in the 7th century. The Buddhist Turk Shahi of Kabul was replaced by a Hindu dynasty before the Saffarids conquered the area in 870, this Hindu dynasty was called Hindu Shahi. Much of the northeastern and southern areas of the country remained dominated by Buddhist culture.

Medieval history

Islamic conquest

Arab Muslims brought Islam to Herat and Zaranj in 642 CE and began spreading eastward; some of the native inhabitants they encountered accepted it while others revolted. Before the arrival of Islam, the region used to be home to various beliefs and cults, often resulting in Syncretism between the dominant religions such as Zoroastrianism, Buddhism or Greco-Buddhism, Ancient Iranian religions, Hinduism, Christianity and Judaism. An exemplification of the syncretism in the region would be that people were patrons of Buddhism but still worshipped local Iranian gods such as Ahura Mazda, Lady Nana, Anahita or Mihr(Mithra) and portrayed Greek Gods like Heracles or Tyche as protectors of Buddha. The Zunbils and Kabul Shahi were first conquered in 870 CE by the Saffarid Muslims of Zaranj. Later, the Samanids extended their Islamic influence south of the Hindu Kush. It is reported that Muslims and non-Muslims still lived side by side in Kabul before the Ghaznavids rose to power in the 10th century.

By the 11th century, Mahmud of Ghazni defeated the remaining Hindu rulers and effectively Islamized the wider region, with the exception of Kafiristan. Mahmud made Ghazni into an important city and patronized intellectuals such as the historian Al-Biruni and the poet Ferdowsi. The Ghaznavid dynasty was overthrown by the Ghurids in 1186, whose architectural achievements included the remote Minaret of Jam. The Ghurids controlled Afghanistan for less than a century before being conquered by the Khwarazmian dynasty in 1215.

Mongols and Babur with the Lodi Dynasty

In 1219 CE, Genghis Khan and his Mongol army overran the region. His troops are said to have annihilated the Khwarazmian cities of Herat and Balkh as well as Bamyan. The destruction caused by the Mongols forced many locals to return to an agrarian rural society. Mongol rule continued with the Ilkhanate in the northwest while the Khalji dynasty administered the Afghan tribal areas south of the Hindu Kush until the invasion of Timur (aka Tamerlane), who established the Timurid Empire in 1370. Under the rule of Shah Rukh the city served as the focal point of the Timurid Renaissance, whose glory matched Florence of the Italian Renaissance as the center of a cultural rebirth.

In the early 16th century, Babur arrived from Ferghana and captured Kabul from the Arghun dynasty. Babur would go on to conquer the Afghan Lodi dynasty who had ruled the Delhi Sultanate in the First Battle of Panipat. Between the 16th and 18th century, the Uzbek Khanate of Bukhara, Iranian Safavids, and Indian Mughals ruled parts of the territory. During the Medieval Period, the northwestern area of Afghanistan was referred to by the regional name Khorasan. Two of the four capitals of Khorasan (Herat and Balkh) are now located in Afghanistan, while the regions of Kandahar, Zabulistan, Ghazni, Kabulistan, and Afghanistan formed the frontier between Khorasan and Hindustan. However, up to the 19th century the term Khorasan was commonly used among natives to describe their country; Sir George Elphinstone wrote with amazement that the country known to outsiders as "Afghanistan" was referred to by its own inhabitants as "Khorasan" and that the first Afghan official whom he met at the border welcomed him to Khorasan.

Modern history

Hotak Dynasty 

In 1709, Mirwais Hotak, a local Ghilzai tribal leader, successfully rebeled against the Safavids. He defeated Gurgin Khan, the Georgian governor of Kandahar under the Safavids, and established his own kingdom. Also defeating many attempts for the Safavids to annex the Kingdom. Mirwais died of natural causes in 1715 and was succeeded by his brother Abdul Aziz, who was soon killed by Mirwais' son Mahmud for possibly planning to sign a peace with the Safavids. Mahmud led campaigns into modern Iran, with his first attempt in 1719 besieging Kerman, however this attempt failed. Mahmud led the Afghan army in 1722 to the Persian capital of Isfahan, and captured the city after the Battle of Gulnabad and proclaimed himself King of Persia. The Afghan dynasty was ousted from Persia by Nader Shah after the 1729 Battle of Damghan.

Fall of the Hotak Dynasty 

In 1738, Nader Shah and his forces captured Kandahar in the siege of Kandahar, the last Hotak stronghold, from Shah Hussain Hotak. Soon after, the Persian and Afghan forces invaded India, Nader Shah had plundered Delhi, alongside his 16 year old commander, Ahmad Shah Durrani who had assisted him on these campaigns. Nader Shah was assassinated in 1747.

Rise of the Durrani Empire 

After the death of Nader Shah in 1747, Ahmad Shah Durrani had returned to Kandahar with a contingent of 4,000 Pashtuns. The Abdalis had "unanimously accepted" Ahmad Shah as their new leader. With his ascension in 1747, Ahmad Shah had led multiple campaigns against the Mughal Empire, Maratha Empire, and then receding, Afsharid Empire. Ahmad Shah had captured Kabul and Peshawar from the Mughal appointed governor, Nasir Khan. Ahmad Shah had then conquered Herat in 1750, and had also captured Kashmir in 1752. Ahmad Shah had launched two campaigns into Khorasan, (1750–1751) and (1754–1755). His first campaign had seen the siege of Mashhad, however he was forced to retreat after 4 months. In November 1750, he moved to siege Nishapur, however he was unable to capture the city and was forced to retreat after heavy losses in early 1751. Ahmad Shah returned in 1754, he captured Tun, and on 23 July, he sieged Mashhad once again. Mashhad had fallen on 2 December, however Shahrokh was reappointed in 1755. He was forced to give up Torshiz, Bakharz, Jam, Khaf, and Turbat-e Haidari to the Afghans, as well as accepting Afghan sovereignty. Following this, Ahmad Shah had sieged Nishapur once again, and captured it.

Objectives and Invasions of India 

Ahmad Shah invaded India 8 times during his reign. With the capture of Peshawar, Ahmad Shah had used this as a convenient striking point to lead his military campaigns into Punjab and India.

Ahmad Shah had sought out multiple reasons for his invasions, Ahmad Shah saw Afghanistan in a dire state, and one that needed to expand and exploit a weak but rich neighboring country, which Ahmad Shah had capitalized on in multiple opportunities during his Invasions of India, he sought the reasons needed to fill his treasury in a war-plunder conquest based economy. Ahmad Shah had launched his first invasion in 1748, crossing the indus river, his armies sacked and absorbed Lahore into the Durrani Realm. Ahmad Shah had met Mughal armies at the Battle of Manupur (1748), where he was defeated and forced to retreat to back to Afghanistan. Ahmad Shah had returned the next year in 1749, where he had captured the area around Lahore and Punjab, presenting it as an Afghan victory for this campaign. From 1749 to 1767, Ahmad Shah would lead 6 more invasions, the most important being his sixth invasion, with the Third Battle of Panipat, which created a power vacuum in northern India, halting Maratha expansion.

Death of Ahmad Shah and his successors

Ahmad Shah Durrani had died in October 1772, what followed would be a civil war in succession, with his named successor, Timur Shah Durrani succeeding him after the defeat of his brother, Suleiman Mirza.

Timur Shah Durrani ascended to the throne in November 1772, having defeated a coalition under Shah Wali Khan, the influential prime minister of the Durrani Empire, and Humayun Mirza. Timur Shah began his reign by consolidating power toward himself and people loyal to him, purging Durrani Sardars and influential tribal leaders in Kabul and Kandahar to bring support toward himself. Timur Shah's reforms also saw the capital of the Durrani Empire being shifted from Kandahar to Kabul, being able to cover the empire better as a base of ordination since it was essentially the heartland of the empire. This reform saw Kabul as the modern capital of Afghanistan today. Having consolidated power to himself, Timur Shah would fight multiple series of rebellions to consolidate and hold the empire apart, Timur Shah would also lead campaigns into Punjab against the Sikhs like his father did, however being more successful. Most prominent example of his battles during this campaign would be where Timur Shah led his forces under Zangi Khan Durrani, with over 18,000 men total of Afghan, Qizilbash, and Mongol cavalrymen. Against over 60,000 Sikh men. The Sikhs would lose over 30,000 in this battle and would stage a Durrani resurgence in the Punjab. region The Durranis lost Multan in 1772 after Ahmad Shah's death, following this victory by Timur Shah, Timur Shah was able to lay siege to Multan and recapture it, incorporating it into the Durrani empire once again, reintegrating it as a province until the siege of Multan (1818). Timur Shah would be succeeded by his son, Zaman Shah Durrani after his death on 18 or 20 May 1793. Timur Shah's reign oversaw the attempted stabilization and consolidation of the empire. However, Timur Shah had over 24 sons, a mistake that would plunge the empire in civil war over succession crises.

Zaman Shah Durrani would succeed to the Durrani Throne following the death of his father, Timur Shah Durrani. This instigated civil war with his brothers, Mahmud Shah Durrani, and Humayun Mirza revolting against him. With Humayun centered in Kandahar, and Mahmud Shah centered in Herat. Zaman Shah would defeat Humayun and also force the loyalty of Mahmud Shah Durrani. Securing his position on the throne, Zaman Shah had led 3 campaigns into Punjab, with the first two campaigns capturing Lahore, but being forced to retreat due to intel about a possible Qajar invasion, or his brother, Mahmud Shah Durrani revolting. Zaman Shah embarked on his third campaign for Punjab in 1800 to deal with a rebellious Ranjit Singh. However, he was forced to withdraw, with his brother, Mahmud Shah Durrani revolting, Zaman Shah would be toppled from his reign, replaced by his brother, Mahmud Shah Durrani. However, just under 2 years in his reign, Mahmud Shah Durrani would be deposed by his brother, Shah Shuja Durrani, on 13 July 1803. Shah Shuja would attempt to consolidate the Durrani Realm, which had been long striven by civil war. Shah Shuja would later be deposed by his brother at the Battle of Nimla (1809), where Mahmud Shah Durrani would defeat and force Shah Shuja to flee, with Shah Mahmud usurping the throne again for his second reign beginning on 3 May 1809.

Barakzai dynasty and British wars 

By the early 19th century, the Afghan empire was under threat from the Persians in the west and the Sikh Empire in the east. Fateh Khan, leader of the Barakzai tribe, installed many of his brothers in positions of power throughout the empire, mostly ruling as governors of major cities and provinces. After his murder for apparent treason against the Durrani king. Fateh Khan would be sentenced by Mahmud Shah Durrani, having him executed. His brothers rebeled and a civil war brew between the Sadozais and the Barakzais. During this turbulent period, Afghanistan had fractured into many states, this included the Principality of Qandahar, Emirate of Herat, Khanate of Qunduz, Maimana Khanate, and many more states. The most prominent state being the Emirate of Kabul, ruled by Dost Mohammad Khan after he declared himself emir and was bestowed upon the title of Amir al-Mu'minin in summer 1826 after he usurped the throne from his brother, Sultan Mohammad Khan. With the collapse of the Durrani Empire, and the exile of the Sadozai Dynasty to be left to rule in Herat while Afghanistan was in this turbulent period of civil war, Punjab and Kashmir were lost to Ranjit Singh ruler of the Sikh Empire, who invaded Khyber Pakhtunkhwa in March 1823 and captured the city of Peshawar, placing the Peshawar Sardars under his suzerainty. (one of the many entities that split following the collapse of the Durrani Empire), at the Battle of Nowshera. In 1837, Dost Mohammad Khan attempted to retake Peshawar and sent a large force under his son, Wazir Akbar Khan, leading to the Battle of Jamrud near the Khyber Pass. Akbar Khan and the Afghan army failed to capture the Jamrud Fort from the Sikh Khalsa Army, but killed Sikh Commander Hari Singh Nalwa, thus ending the Afghan-Sikh Wars. By this time the British were advancing from the east, conquering the Sikh Empire after it had its own period of turbulence following the death of Ranjit Singh, directly bringing the Emirate of Kabul to conflict in the first major conflict during "the Great Game".

In 1839, a British expeditionary force marched into Afghanistan, invading the Principality of Qandahar, and in August 1839, seized Kabul, forcing Dost Mohammad into exile with other factions and rebels in Afghanistan, while he was replaced with the former Durrani ruler Shah Shuja Durrani as the new ruler of Kabul, and unbeknownst to him, a de facto puppet on the throne. Following an uprising that saw the assassination of Shah Shuja, the 1842 retreat from Kabul of British-Indian forces and the annihilation of Elphinstone's army, and the punitive expedition of The battle of Kabul that led to its sacking, the British gave up on their attempts to try and subjugate Afghanistan, which allowed Dost Mohammad Khan to return as ruler. Dost Mohammad Khan would spend most of his reign consolidating the parts of Afghanistan that were lost in the Afghan civil war which raged from 1793–1863. Dost Mohammad Khan would launch numerous campaigns after returning to rule in 1842, ruling only from Kabul, Ghazni, and other cities when he had returned. Dost Mohammad united most of the Afghan realm in his reign, securing the last major state, Herat, in the Herat campaign of 1862–1863. Dost Mohammad died on 9 June 1863, a few weeks after his campaign to capture Herat. Dost Mohammad's successors would fight for the throne of Afghanistan, between Sher Ali Khan, Mohammad Afzal Khan, and Mohammad Azam Khan in the Afghan Civil War (1863–1869). Sher Ali would win this civil war and would go on to rule the realm until In 1878, the British had returned in the Second Anglo-Afghan War which was fought over perceived Russian influence in the region, Abdur Rahman Khan replaced Ayub Khan who had succeeded Sher Ali Khan after his death in 1879. Britain would gain control of Afghanistan's foreign relations as part of the Treaty of Gandamak of 1879, making it an official British Protected State. In 1893, Amir Abdur Rahman signed an agreement in which the ethnic Pashtun and Baloch territories were divided by the Durand Line, which forms the modern-day border between Pakistan and Afghanistan. Shia-dominated Hazarajat and pagan Kafiristan remained politically independent until being conquered by Abdur Rahman Khan in 1891–1896. He was known as the "Iron Amir" for his features and his ruthless methods against tribes. The Iron Amir viewed railway and telegraph lines coming from the Russian and British as "trojan horses" and therefore prevented railway development in Afghanistan. He died in 1901, succeeded by his son, Habibullah Khan.

During the First World War, when Afghanistan was neutral, Habibullah Khan was met by officials of the Central Powers in the Niedermayer–Hentig Expedition, to declare full independence from the United Kingdom, join them and attack British India, as part of the Hindu–German Conspiracy. Their efforts to bring Afghanistan into the Central Powers failed, but it caused discontent among the population for keeping neutrality against the British. Habibullah was assassinated during a hunting trip in February 1919, and Amanullah Khan eventually assumed power. A staunch supporter of the 1915–1916 expeditions, Amanullah Khan provoked the Third Anglo-Afghan War, entering British India via the Khyber Pass.

After the end of the Third Anglo-Afghan War and the signing of the Treaty of Rawalpindi on 19 August 1919, Emir Amanullah Khan declared the Emirate of Afghanistan a sovereign and fully independent state. He moved to end his country's traditional isolation by establishing diplomatic relations with the international community, particularly with the Soviet Union and the Weimar Republic of Germany. He proclaimed himself King of Afghanistan on 9 June 1926, when the Emirate of Afghanistan became the Kingdom of Afghanistan. Following a 1927–28 tour of Europe and Turkey, he introduced several reforms intended to modernize his nation. A key force behind these reforms was Mahmud Tarzi, an ardent supporter of the education of women. He fought for Article 68 of Afghanistan's 1923 constitution, which made elementary education compulsory. The institution of slavery was abolished in the Emirate of Afghanistan in 1923. King Amanullah's wife, Queen Soraya, was an important figure during this period in the fight for woman's education and against their oppression.

Some of the reforms that were put in place, such as the abolition of the traditional burqa for women and the opening of several co-educational schools, quickly alienated many tribal and religious leaders, and this led to the Afghan Civil War (1928–1929). Faced with the overwhelming armed opposition, King Amanullah abdicated in January 1929, and soon after Kabul fell to Saqqawist forces led by Habibullah Kalakani. Prince Mohammed Nadir Shah, Amanullah's cousin, in turn defeated and killed Kalakani in October 1929, and was declared King Nadir Shah. He abandoned the reforms of King Amanullah in favor of a more gradual approach to modernization,  but was assassinated in 1933 by Abdul Khaliq, a fifteen-year-old Hazara student who was an Amanullah loyalist.

Mohammed Zahir Shah, Nadir Shah's 19-year-old son, succeeded to the throne and reigned as King from 1933 to 1973. The tribal revolts of 1944–1947 saw King Zahir's reign challenged by Zadran, Safi, Mangal, and Wazir tribesmen led by Mazrak Zadran, Salemai, and Mirzali Khan, among others, many of whom were Amanullah loyalists. Close relations with the Muslim states Turkey, the Hashemite Kingdom of Iraq and Iran/Persia were also pursued, while further international relations were sought by joining the League of Nations in 1934. The 1930s saw the development of roads, infrastructure, the founding of a national bank, and increased education. Road links in the north played a large part in a growing cotton and textile industry. The country built close relationships with the Axis powers, with Nazi Germany having the largest share in Afghan development at the time, along with the Kingdom of Italy and the Empire of Japan.

Contemporary history

Until 1946, King Zahir ruled with the assistance of his uncle, who held the post of Prime Minister and continued the policies of Nadir Shah. Another of Zahir Shah's uncles, Shah Mahmud Khan, became Prime Minister in 1946 and began an experiment allowing greater political freedom, but reversed the policy when it went further than he expected. He was replaced in 1953 by Mohammed Daoud Khan, the king's cousin and brother-in-law, and a Pashtun nationalist who sought the creation of a Pashtunistan, leading to highly tense relations with Pakistan. During his ten years at the post until 1963, Daoud Khan pressed for social modernization reforms and sought a closer relationship with the Soviet Union. Afterward, the 1964 constitution was formed, and the first non-royal Prime Minister was sworn in.

King Zahir Shah, like his father Nadir Shah, had a policy of maintaining national independence while pursuing gradual modernization, creating nationalist feeling, and improving relations with the United Kingdom. However, Afghanistan remained neutral and was neither a participant in World War II nor aligned with either power bloc in the Cold War thereafter. However, it was a beneficiary of the latter rivalry as both the Soviet Union and the United States vied for influence by building Afghanistan's main highways, airports, and other vital infrastructure in the post-war period. On a per capita basis, Afghanistan received more Soviet development aid than any other country. Afghanistan had, therefore, good relations with both Cold War enemies. In 1973, while the King was in Italy, Daoud Khan launched a bloodless coup and became the first President of Afghanistan, abolishing the monarchy.

Democratic Republic and Soviet war

In April 1978, the communist People's Democratic Party of Afghanistan (PDPA) seized power in a bloody coup d'état against then-President Mohammed Daoud Khan, in what is called the Saur Revolution. The PDPA declared the establishment of the Democratic Republic of Afghanistan, with its first leader named as People's Democratic Party general secretary Nur Muhammad Taraki. This would trigger a series of events that would dramatically turn Afghanistan from a poor and secluded (albeit peaceful) country to a hotbed of international terrorism. The PDPA initiated various social, symbolic and land distribution reforms that provoked strong opposition, while also brutally oppressing political dissidents. This caused unrest and quickly expanded into a state of civil war by 1979, waged by guerrilla mujahideen (and smaller Maoist guerrillas) against regime forces countrywide. It quickly turned into a proxy war as the Pakistani government provided these rebels with covert training centers, the United States supported them through Pakistan's Inter-Services Intelligence (ISI), and the Soviet Union sent thousands of military advisers to support the PDPA regime. Meanwhile, there was increasingly hostile friction between the competing factions of the PDPA – the dominant Khalq and the more moderate Parcham.

In September 1979, PDPA General Secretary Taraki was assassinated in an internal coup orchestrated by fellow Khalq member, then-prime minister Hafizullah Amin, who assumed the new general secretary of the People's Democratic Party. The situation in the country deteriorated under Amin and thousands of people went missing. Displeased with Amin's government, the Soviet Army invaded the country in December 1979, heading for Kabul and killing Amin just three days later. A Soviet-organized regime, led by Parcham's Babrak Karmal but inclusive of both factions (Parcham and Khalq), filled the vacuum. Soviet troops in more substantial numbers were deployed to stabilize Afghanistan under Karmal, marking the beginning of the Soviet–Afghan War. The United States and Pakistan, along with smaller actors like Saudi Arabia and China, continued supporting the rebels, delivering billions of dollars in cash and weapons including two thousand FIM-92 Stinger surface-to-air missiles. Lasting nine years, the war caused the deaths of between 562,000 and 2 million Afghans, and displaced about 6 million people who subsequently fled Afghanistan, mainly to Pakistan and Iran. Heavy air bombardment destroyed many countryside villages, millions of landmines were planted, and some cities such as Herat and Kandahar were also damaged from bombardment. Pakistan's North-West Frontier Province functioned as an organizational and networking base for the anti-Soviet Afghan resistance, with the province's influential Deobandi ulama playing a major supporting role in promoting the 'jihad'. After the Soviet withdrawal, the civil war ensued until the communist regime under People's Democratic Party leader Mohammad Najibullah collapsed in 1992.

The Soviet-Afghan War had drastic social effects on Afghanistan. The militarization of society led to heavily armed police, private bodyguards, openly armed civil defense groups and other such things becoming the norm in Afghanistan for decades thereafter. The traditional power structure had shifted from clergy, community elders, intelligentsia and military in favor of powerful warlords.

Post–Cold War conflict

Another civil war broke out after the creation of a dysfunctional coalition government between leaders of various mujahideen factions. Amid a state of anarchy and factional infighting, various mujahideen factions committed widespread rape, murder and extortion, while Kabul was heavily bombarded and partially destroyed by the fighting. Several failed reconciliations and alliances occurred between different leaders. The Taliban emerged in September 1994 as a movement and militia of students (talib) from Islamic madrassas (schools) in Pakistan, who soon had military support from Pakistan. Taking control of Kandahar city that year, they conquered more territories until finally driving out the government of Rabbani from Kabul in 1996, where they established an emirate that gained international recognition from 3 countries: Pakistan, Saudi Arabia, and the United Arab Emirates. The Taliban were condemned internationally for the harsh enforcement of their interpretation of Islamic sharia law, which resulted in the brutal treatment of many Afghans, especially women. During their rule, the Taliban and their allies committed massacres against Afghan civilians, denied UN food supplies to starving civilians and conducted a policy of scorched earth, burning vast areas of fertile land and destroying tens of thousands of homes.

After the fall of Kabul to the Taliban, Ahmad Shah Massoud and Abdul Rashid Dostum formed the Northern Alliance, later joined by others, to resist the Taliban. Dostum's forces were defeated by the Taliban during the Battles of Mazar-i-Sharif in 1997 and 1998; Pakistan's Chief of Army Staff, Pervez Musharraf, began sending thousands of Pakistanis to help the Taliban defeat the Northern Alliance. By 2000 the Northern Alliance only controlled 10% of territory, cornered in the north-east. On 9 September 2001, Massoud was assassinated by two Arab suicide attackers in Panjshir Valley. Around 400,000 Afghans died in internal conflicts between 1990 and 2001.

US invasion and Islamic Republic 

In October 2001, the United States invaded Afghanistan to remove the Taliban from power after they refused to hand over Osama Bin Laden, the prime suspect of the September 11 attacks, who was a "guest" of the Taliban and was operating his al-Qaeda network in Afghanistan. The majority of Afghans supported the American invasion of their country. During the initial invasion, US and UK forces bombed al-Qaeda training camps, and later working with the Northern Alliance, the Taliban regime came to an end.

In December 2001, after the Taliban government was overthrown, the Afghan Interim Administration under Hamid Karzai was formed. The International Security Assistance Force (ISAF) was established by the UN Security Council to help assist the Karzai administration and provide basic security. By this time, after two decades of war as well as an acute famine at the time, Afghanistan had one of the highest infant and child mortality rates in the world, the lowest life expectancy, much of the population were hungry, and infrastructure was in ruins. Many foreign donors started providing aid and assistance to rebuild the war-torn country.

Taliban forces meanwhile began regrouping inside Pakistan, while more coalition troops entered Afghanistan to help the rebuilding process. The Taliban began an insurgency to regain control of Afghanistan. Over the next decade, ISAF and Afghan troops led many offensives against the Taliban, but failed to fully defeat them. Afghanistan remained one of the poorest countries in the world because of a lack of foreign investment, government corruption, and the Taliban insurgency.

Meanwhile, Karzai attempted to unite the peoples of the country, and the Afghan government was able to build some democratic structures, adopting a constitution in 2004 with the name Islamic Republic of Afghanistan. Attempts were made, often with the support of foreign donor countries, to improve the country's economy, healthcare, education, transport, and agriculture. ISAF forces also began to train the Afghan National Security Forces. Following 2002, nearly five million Afghans were repatriated. The number of NATO troops present in Afghanistan peaked at 140,000 in 2011, dropping to about 16,000 in 2018.

In September 2014 Ashraf Ghani became president after the 2014 presidential election where for the first time in Afghanistan's history power was democratically transferred. On 28 December 2014, NATO formally ended ISAF combat operations in Afghanistan and transferred full security responsibility to the Afghan government. The NATO-led Operation Resolute Support was formed the same day as a successor to ISAF. Thousands of NATO troops remained in the country to train and advise Afghan government forces and continue their fight against the Taliban. 

On 19 February 2020, the US–Taliban deal was made in Qatar. The 2020 US–Taliban deal was one of the critical events that caused the collapse of the Afghan National Security Forces (ANSF); following the signing of the deal, the US dramatically reduced the number of air attacks and deprived the ANSF of a critical edge in fighting the Taliban insurgency, leading to the Taliban takeover of Kabul.

Second Taliban era 
NATO Secretary General Jens Stoltenberg announced on 14 April 2021 that the alliance had agreed to start withdrawing its troops from Afghanistan by 1 May. Soon after NATO troops began withdrawing, the Taliban launched an offensive against the Afghan government and quickly advanced in front of collapsing Afghan government forces. The Taliban captured the capital city of Kabul on 15 August 2021, after regaining control over a vast majority of Afghanistan. Several foreign diplomats and Afghan government officials, including president Ashraf Ghani, were evacuated from the country, with many Afghan civilians attempting to flee along with them. An unofficial "coordination council" led by senior statesmen was formed the next day to transfer the state institutions of the Islamic Republic of Afghanistan to the Taliban. On 17 August, first vice president Amrullah Saleh proclaimed himself caretaker president and announced the formation of an anti-Taliban front with a reported 6,000+ troops in the Panjshir Valley, along with Ahmad Massoud. However, by 6 September, the Taliban had taken control of most of Panjshir Province, with resistance fighters retreating to the mountains. Clashes in the valley ceased mid-September, as Saleh and Massoud had fled to neighboring Tajikistan.

According to the Costs of War Project, 176,000 people were killed in the conflict, including 46,319 civilians, between 2001 and 2021. According to the Uppsala Conflict Data Program, at least 212,191 people were killed in the conflict. Following the 2001 invasion, more than 5.7 million refugees returned to Afghanistan; however, in 2021, 2.6 million Afghans remained refugees, primarily in Iran and Pakistan, and another 4 million were internally displaced.

The Taliban government is led by supreme leader Hibatullah Akhundzada and acting prime minister Hasan Akhund, who took office on 7 September 2021. Akhund is one of the four founders of the Taliban and was a deputy prime minister of the previous emirate; his appointment was seen as a compromise between moderates and hardliners. A new, all-male cabinet was formed, which included Abdul Hakim Ishaqzai as minister of justice. On 20 September 2021, United Nations Secretary-General António Guterres received a letter from acting minister of foreign affairs Amir Khan Muttaqi to formally claim Afghanistan's seat as a member state for their official spokesman in Doha, Suhail Shaheen. The United Nations did not recognize the previous Taliban government and chose to work with the then-government in exile instead.

Western nations suspended most of their humanitarian aid to Afghanistan following the Taliban's August 2021 takeover of the country; the World Bank and International Monetary Fund also halted their payments. More than half of Afghanistan's 39 million people faced an acute food shortage in October 2021. Human Rights Watch reported on 11 November 2021 that Afghanistan was facing widespread famine due to an economic and banking crisis.

Though the state of war in the country ended in 2021, armed conflict persists in some regions amid fighting between the Taliban and the local branch of the Islamic State, as well as an anti-Taliban Republican insurgency. A year into Taliban rule, former president Hamid Karzai said in an interview: "In terms of [an] end to widespread fighting and conflict, we are happy — there's more stability, there's more security. But in terms of Afghanistan having a government that all Afghan people find themselves [in], we still have a way to go. In terms of the economy of the country, it's a disaster."

Geography 

Afghanistan is located in Southern-Central Asia. The region centered at Afghanistan is considered the "crossroads of Asia", and the country has had the nickname Heart of Asia. The renowned Urdu poet Allama Iqbal once wrote about the country:

There is no coastline, as Afghanistan is landlocked. Afghanistan shares its longest land border (the Durand Line) with Pakistan to the east and south, followed by borders with Tajikistan to the north-east, Iran to the west, Turkmenistan to the north-west, Uzbekistan to the north and China to the north-east; India recognizes a border with Afghanistan through Pakistani-administered Kashmir. Clockwise from south-west, Afghanistan shares borders with the Sistan and Baluchestan Province, South Khorasan Province and Razavi Khorasan Province of Iran; Ahal Region, Mary Region and Lebap Region of Turkmenistan; Surxondaryo Region of Uzbekistan; Khatlon Region and Gorno-Badakhshan Autonomous Region of Tajikistan; Xinjiang Uyghur Autonomous Region of China; and the Gilgit-Baltistan territory, Khyber Pakhtunkhwa province and Balochistan province of Pakistan.

The geography in Afghanistan is varied, but is mostly mountainous and rugged, with some unusual mountain ridges accompanied by plateaus and river basins. It is dominated by the Hindu Kush range, the western extension of the Himalayas that stretches to eastern Tibet via the Pamir Mountains and Karakoram Mountains in Afghanistan's far north-east. Most of the highest points are in the east consisting of fertile mountain valleys, often considered part of the "Roof of the World". The Hindu Kush ends at the west-central highlands, creating plains in the north and southwest, namely the Turkestan Plains and the Sistan Basin; these two regions consist of rolling grasslands and semi-deserts, and hot windy deserts, respectively. Forests exist in the corridor between Nuristan and Paktika provinces (see East Afghan montane conifer forests), and tundra in the north-east.

Despite having numerous rivers and reservoirs, large parts of the country are dry. The endorheic Sistan Basin is one of the driest regions in the world. The Amu Darya rises at the north of the Hindu Kush, while the nearby Hari Rud flows west towards Herat, and the Arghandab River from the central region southwards. To the south and west of the Hindu Kush flow a number of streams that are tributaries of the Indus River, such as the Helmand River. One exception is the Kabul River which flows in an easterly direction to the Indus ending at the Indian Ocean. Afghanistan receives heavy snow during the winter in the Hindu Kush and Pamir Mountains, and the melting snow in the spring season enters the rivers, lakes, and streams. However, two-thirds of the country's water flows into the neighboring countries of Iran, Pakistan, and Turkmenistan. As reported in 2010, the state needs more than US$2 billion to rehabilitate its irrigation systems so that the water is properly managed.

The northeastern Hindu Kush mountain range, in and around the Badakhshan Province of Afghanistan, is in a geologically active area where earthquakes may occur almost every year. They can be deadly and destructive, causing landslides in some parts or avalanches during the winter. The last strong earthquakes were in 1998, which killed about 6,000 people in Badakhshan near Tajikistan. This was followed by the 2002 Hindu Kush earthquakes in which over 150 people were killed and over 1,000 injured. A 2010 earthquake left 11 Afghans dead, over 70 injured, and more than 2,000 houses destroyed. In June 2022, a destructive 5.9 earthquake struck near the border with Pakistan, killing at least 1,150 people and sparking fears of a major humanitarian crisis.

Climate

The country is generally arid in the summers, with most rainfall falling between December and April. The lower areas of northern and western Afghanistan are the driest, with precipitation more common in the east. Although proximate to India, Afghanistan is mostly outside the monsoon zone, except the Nuristan Province which occasionally receives summer monsoon rain.

Biodiversity

Several types of mammals exist throughout Afghanistan. Snow leopards, Siberian tigers and brown bears live in the high elevation alpine tundra regions. The Marco Polo sheep exclusively live in the Wakhan Corridor region of north-east Afghanistan. Foxes, wolves, otters, deer, wild sheep, lynx and other big cats populate the mountain forest region of the east. In the semi-desert northern plains, wildlife include a variety of birds, hedgehogs, gophers, and large carnivores such as jackals and hyenas.

Gazelles, wild pigs and jackals populate the steppe plains of the south and west, while mongoose and cheetahs exist in the semi-desert south. Marmots and ibex also live in the high mountains of Afghanistan, and pheasants exist in some parts of the country. The Afghan hound is a native breed of dog known for its fast speed and its long hair; it is relatively known in the west.

Endemic fauna of Afghanistan includes the Afghan flying squirrel, Afghan snowfinch, Paradactylodon (or the "Paghman mountain salamander"), Stigmella kasyi, Vulcaniella kabulensis, Afghan leopard gecko, Wheeleria parviflorellus, amongst others. Endemic flora include Iris afghanica. Afghanistan has a wide variety of birds despite its relatively arid climate – an estimated 460 species of which 235 breed within.

The forest region of Afghanistan has vegetation such as pine trees, spruce trees, fir trees and larches, whereas the steppe grassland regions consist of broadleaf trees, short grass, perennial plants and shrublands. The colder high elevation regions are composed of hardy grasses and small flowering plants. Several regions are designated protected areas; there are three national parks: Band-e Amir, Wakhan and Nuristan. Afghanistan had a 2018 Forest Landscape Integrity Index mean score of 8.85/10, ranking it 15th globally out of 172 countries.

Demographics 

The population of Afghanistan was estimated at 32.9 million as of 2019 by the Afghanistan Statistics and Information Authority, whereas the UN estimates over 38.0 million. In 1979 the total population was reported to be about 15.5 million. About 23.9% of them are urbanite, 71.4% live in rural areas, and the remaining 4.7% are nomadic. An additional 3 million or so Afghans are temporarily housed in neighboring Pakistan and Iran, most of whom were born and raised in those two countries. As of 2013, Afghanistan was the largest refugee-producing country in the world, a title held for 32 years.

The current population growth rate is 2.37%, one of the highest in the world outside of Africa. This population is expected to reach 82 million by 2050 if current population trends continue. The population of Afghanistan increased steadily until the 1980s, when civil war caused millions to flee to other countries such as Pakistan. Millions have since returned and the war conditions contribute to the country having the highest fertility rate outside Africa. Afghanistan's healthcare has recovered since the turn of the century, causing falls in infant mortality and increases in life expectancy, although it has the lowest life expectance of any country outside Africa. This (along with other factors such as returning refugees) caused rapid population growth in the 2000s that has only recently started to slow down. The Gini coefficient in 2008 was 27.8.

Ethnicity and languages 

Afghans are divided into several ethnolinguistic groups. Off of sociological research data by The Asia Foundation in 2019, the Pashtuns are the largest ethnic group, comprising 39%, followed by Tajiks, comprising 37%. of the country's population. The other two major ethnic groups are the Hazaras and Uzbeks. A further 10 other ethnic groups are recognized and each are represented in the Afghan National Anthem.

Dari and Pashto are the official languages of Afghanistan; bilingualism is very common. Dari, which is also referred to as Eastern Persian as it is a variety of and mutually intelligible with Persian (and very often called 'Farsi' by some Afghans like in Iran) functions as the lingua franca in Kabul as well as in much of the northern and northwestern parts of the country. Native speakers of Dari, of any ethnicity, are sometimes called Farsiwans. Pashto is the native tongue of the Pashtuns, although many of them are also fluent in Dari while some non-Pashtuns are fluent in Pashto. Despite the Pashtuns having been dominant in Afghan politics for centuries, Dari remained the preferred language for government and bureaucracy. 
According to CIA World Factbook, Dari Persian is spoken by 78% (L1 + L2) and functions as the lingua franca, while Pashto is spoken by 50%, Uzbek 10%, English 5%, Turkmen 2%, Urdu 2%, Pashayi 1%, Nuristani 1%, Arabic 1%, and Balochi 1% (2021 est). Data represent the most widely spoken languages; shares sum to more than 100% because there is much bilingualism in the country and because respondents were allowed to select more than one language. There are a number of smaller regional languages, including Uzbek, Turkmen, Balochi, Pashayi, and Nuristani.

When it comes to foreign languages among the populace, many are able to speak or understand Hindustani (Urdu-Hindi), partly due to returning Afghan refugees from Pakistan and the popularity of Bollywood films respectively. English is also understood by some of the population, and has been gaining popularity as of the 2000s. Some Afghans retain some ability in Russian, which was taught in public schools during the 1980s.

Religion 

The CIA estimated in 2009 that 99.7% of the Afghan population was Muslim and most are thought to adhere to the Sunni Hanafi school. According to Pew Research Center, as much as 90% are of the Sunni denomination, 7% Shia and 3% non-denominational. The CIA Factbook variously estimates up to 89.7% Sunni or up to 15% Shia.

Afghan Sikhs and Hindus are also found in certain major cities (namely Kabul, Jalalabad, Ghazni, Kandahar) accompanied by gurdwaras and mandirs. According to Deutsche Welle in September 2021, 250 remain in the country after 67 were evacuated to India.

There was a small Jewish community in Afghanistan, living mainly in Herat and Kabul. Over the years, this small community was forced leave due to decades of warfare and religious persecution. By the end of the twentieth century, nearly the entire community had emigrated to Israel and the United States, with one known exception, Herat-born Zablon Simintov. He remained for years, being the caretaker of the only remaining Afghan synagog. He left the country for the US after the second Taliban takeover. A woman who left shortly after him has since been identified as the likely last Jew in Afghanistan.

Afghan Christians, who number 500–8,000, practice their faith secretly due to intense societal opposition, and there are no public churches.

Urbanization
As estimated by the CIA World Factbook, 26% of the population was urbanized as of 2020. This is one of the lowest figures in the world; in Asia it is only higher than Cambodia, Nepal and Sri Lanka. Urbanization has increased rapidly, particularly in the capital Kabul, due to returning refugees from Pakistan and Iran after 2001, internally displaced people, and rural migrants. Urbanization in Afghanistan is different from typical urbanization in that it is centered on just a few cities.

The only city with over a million residents is its capital, Kabul, located in the east of the country. The other large cities are located generally in the "ring" around the Central Highlands, namely Kandahar in the south, Herat in the west, Mazar-i-Sharif, Kunduz in the north, and Jalalabad in the east.

Education 

Education in Afghanistan is overseen by the Ministry of Education and the Ministry of Higher Education. There are over 16,000 schools in the country and roughly 9 million students. Of this, about 60% are males and 40% females. However, the new regime has thus far forbidden female teachers and female students from returning to secondary schools. Over 174,000 students are enrolled in different universities around the country. About 21% of these are females. Former Education Minister Ghulam Farooq Wardak had stated that construction of 8,000 schools is required for the remaining children who are deprived of formal learning. As of 2018 the literacy rate of the population age 15 and older is 43.02% (males 55.48% and females 29.81%).

The top universities in Afghanistan are the American University of Afghanistan (AUAF) followed by Kabul University (KU), both of which are located in Kabul. The National Military Academy of Afghanistan, modeled after the United States Military Academy at West Point, was a four-year military development institution dedicated to graduating officers for the Afghan Armed Forces. The Afghan Defense University was constructed near Qargha in Kabul. Major universities outside of Kabul include Kandahar University in the south, Herat University in the northwest, Balkh University and Kunduz University in the north, Nangarhar University and Khost University in the east. Kabul University was founded in 1932 and is a respected institute that played a significant part in the country's education; from the 1960s the Kabul University was also a hotbed of radical political ideologies such as Marxism and Islamism, which played major parts in society, politics and the war that began in 1978.

After the Taliban regained power in 2021, it became unclear to what extent female education would continue in the country. In March 2022, after they had been closed for some time, it was announced that girl's schools after 6th grade would be reopened shortly. However, shortly before reopening, the order was rescinded and schools for older girls remained closed.

Despite the ban, six provinces, Balkh, Kunduz, Jowzjan, Sar-I-Pul, Faryab, and the Day Kundi provinces still allow girl's schools from grade 6 and up.

Health 

According to the Human Development Index, Afghanistan is the 15th least developed country in the world. The average life expectancy is estimated to be around 60 years. The country's maternal mortality rate is 396 deaths/100,000 live births and its infant mortality rate is 66 to 112.8 deaths in every 1,000 live births. The Ministry of Public Health plans to cut the infant mortality rate to 400 for every 100,000 live births before 2020. The country has more than 3,000 midwives, with an additional 300 to 400 being trained each year.

There are over 100 hospitals in Afghanistan, with the most advanced treatments being available in Kabul. The French Medical Institute for Children and Indira Gandhi Children's Hospital in Kabul are the leading children's hospitals in the country. Some of the other leading hospitals in Kabul include the Jamhuriat Hospital and Jinnah Hospital. In spite of all this, many Afghans travel to Pakistan and India for advanced treatment.

It was reported in 2006 that nearly 60% of the Afghan population lives within a two-hour walk of the nearest health facility. Disability rate is also high in Afghanistan due to the decades of war. It was reported recently that about 80,000 people are missing limbs. Non-governmental charities such as Save the Children and Mahboba's Promise assist orphans in association with governmental structures. Demographic and Health Surveys is working with the Indian Institute of Health Management Research and others to conduct a survey in Afghanistan focusing on maternal death, among other things.

Governance 

Following the effective collapse of the Islamic Republic of Afghanistan during the 2021 Taliban offensive, the Taliban declared the country an Islamic Emirate. A new caretaker government was announced on 7 September. As of 8 September 2021, no other country had formally recognized the Islamic Emirate of Afghanistan as the de jure government of Afghanistan.

A traditional instrument of governance in Afghanistan is the loya jirga (grand assembly), a Pashtun consultative meeting that was mainly organized for choosing a new head of state, adopting a new constitution, or to settle national or regional issue such as war. Loya jirgas have been held since at least 1747, with the most recent one occurring in August 2020.

Development of Taliban government 

On 17 August 2021, the leader of the Taliban-affiliated Hezb-e-Islami Gulbuddin party, Gulbuddin Hekmatyar, met with both Hamid Karzai, the former President of Afghanistan, and Abdullah Abdullah, the former chairman of the High Council for National Reconciliation and former Chief Executive, in Doha, Qatar, with the aim of forming a national unity government. President Ashraf Ghani, having fled the country during the Taliban advance to either Tajikistan or Uzbekistan, emerged in the United Arab Emirates and said that he supported such negotiations and was in talks to return to Afghanistan. Many figures within the Taliban generally agreed that continuation of the 2004 Constitution of Afghanistan may, if correctly applied, be workable as the basis for the new religious state as their objections to the former government were political, and not religious.

Hours after the final flight of American troops left Kabul on 30 August, a Taliban official interviewed said that a new government would likely be announced as early as Friday 3 September after Jumu'ah. It was added that Hibatullah Akhundzada would be officially named Emir, with cabinet ministers being revealed at the Arg in an official ceremony. Abdul Ghani Baradar would be named head of government as Prime Minister, while other important positions would go to Sirajuddin Haqqani and Mullah Yaqoob. Beneath the supreme leader, day-to-day governance will be entrusted to the cabinet.

According to CNN, the new government is likely to be a unitary Deobandist Islamic republic. In a report by CNN-News18, sources said the new government was going to be governed similarly to Iran with Haibatullah Akhundzada as supreme leader similar to the role of Saayid Ali Khamenei, and would be based out of Kandahar. Baradar or Yaqoob would be head of government as Prime Minister. The government's ministries and agencies will be under a cabinet presided over by the Prime Minister. The Supreme Leader would preside over an executive body known Supreme Council with anywhere from 11 to 72 members. Abdul Hakim Ishaqzai is likely to be promoted to Chief Justice. According to the report, the new government will take place within the framework of an amended 1964 Constitution of Afghanistan.

However, later interviews disclosed to News18 that negotiations were not yet completed and that representatives were still in Kandahar, and that the announcement of the new government would not take place until 4 September or later. Government formation was further delayed with the announcement postponed to some time during the week of 6 September, due to concerns about forming a broad-based government acceptable to the international community. It was later added however that the Taliban's Rahbari Shura, the group's leadership council was divided between the hardline Haqqani Network and moderate Abdul Ghani Baradar over appointments needed to form an "inclusive" government. This culminated in a skirmish which led to Baradar being injured and treated in Pakistan. It was speculated that the government would be announced on 11 September 2021, the 20th anniversary of the 9/11 attacks, with invitations possibly being extended to the governments of Turkey, China, Iran, Pakistan, and Qatar.

As of early September, the Taliban were planning the Cabinet to be men-only, stating that women would not be allowed to "work in high-ranking posts" in the government and that women were "ruled out" from the Cabinet. Journalists and other human rights activists, mostly women, protested in Herat and Kabul, calling for women to be included in the Cabinet. The acting Cabinet announced on 7 September was men-only, and the Ministry of Women's Affairs appeared to have been abolished. On March 23, 2022, there were reports a cabinet shakeup was underway as another meeting of the Leadership Council was held in Kandahar for the second time since the Taliban Islamic Movement came to power as a way to get international recognition. The last meeting of the Leadership Council was held from August 28, 2021, to August 30, 2021.

Administrative divisions 

Afghanistan is administratively divided into 34 provinces (wilayat). Each province has a governor and a capital. The country is further divided into nearly 400 provincial districts, each of which normally covers a city or several villages. Each district is represented by a district governor.

The provincial governors are now appointed by the Prime Minister of Afghanistan, and the district governors are selected by the provincial governors. The provincial governors are representatives of the central government in Kabul and are responsible for all administrative and formal issues within their provinces. There are also provincial councils that are elected through direct and general elections for four years. The functions of provincial councils are to take part in provincial development planning and to participate in the monitoring and appraisal of other provincial governance institutions.

According to article 140 of the constitution and the presidential decree on electoral law, mayors of cities should be elected through free and direct elections for a four-year term. In practice however, mayors are appointed by the government.

The following is a list of all the 34 provinces in alphabetical order:

 Badakhshan
 Badghis
 Baghlan
 Balkh
 Bamyan
 Daykundi
 Farah
 Faryab
 Ghazni
 Ghor
 Helmand
 Herat
 Jowzjan
 Kabul
 Kandahar
 Kapisa
 Khost
 Kunar
 Kunduz
 Laghman
 Logar
 Nangarhar
 Nimruz
 Nuristan
 Oruzgan
 Paktia
 Paktika
 Panjshir
 Parwan
 Samangan
 Sar-e Pol
 Takhar
 Wardak
 Zabul

Foreign relations 

Afghanistan became a member of the United Nations in 1946. Historically, Afghanistan had strong relations with Germany, one of the first countries to recognize Afghanistan's independence in 1919; the Soviet Union, which provided much aid and military training for Afghanistan's forces and includes the signing of a Treaty of Friendship in 1921 and 1978; and India, with which a friendship treaty was signed in 1950. Relations with Pakistan have often been tense for various reasons such as the Durand Line border issue and alleged Pakistani involvement in Afghan insurgent groups.

The present Islamic Emirate of Afghanistan is currently internationally unrecognized, but has had notable unofficial ties with China, Pakistan, and Qatar. Under the previous Islamic Republic of Afghanistan, it enjoyed cordial relations with a number of NATO and allied nations, particularly the United States, Canada, United Kingdom, Germany, Australia, and Turkey. In 2012, the United States and the then-republic in Afghanistan signed their Strategic Partnership Agreement in which Afghanistan became a major non-NATO ally. Such qualification was rescinded by US President Joe Biden in July 2022.

Military

The Armed Forces of the Islamic Emirate of Afghanistan captured a large amount of weapons, hardware, vehicles, aerocrafts, and equipment from the Afghan National Security Forces following the 2021 Taliban offensive and the Fall of Kabul. The total value of the captured equipment has been estimated at US$83 billion.

Human rights 
Homosexuality is taboo in Afghan society; according to the Penal Code, homosexual intimacy is punished by up to a year in prison. With implementing Sharia law offenders can be punished by death. However an ancient tradition involving male homosexual acts between children and older men (typically wealthy warlords or elite people) called bacha bazi persists.

Religious minorities such as Sikhs, Hindus, and Christians have reportedly faced persecution in the country.

Since May 2022, all women in Afghanistan have been required by law to wear full-body coverings when in public (either a burqa or an abaya paired with a niqāb, which leaves only the eyes uncovered). In a May interview with Christiane Amanpour, First Deputy Leader Sirajuddin Haqqani claimed the decree is only advisory and no form of hijab is compulsory in Afghanistan, though this contradicts the reality. It has been speculated that there is a genuine internal policy division over women's rights between hardliners, including Leader Hibatullah Akhundzada, and pragmatists, though they publicly present a united front. Another decree was issued shortly after the first, requiring female TV presenters to cover their faces during broadcasts.

In May 2022, the Taliban dissolved Afghanistan's Human Rights Commission along with four other government departments, citing the country's budget deficit.

Economy 

Afghanistan's nominal GDP was $21.7 billion in 2018, or $72.9 billion by purchasing power parity (PPP). Its GDP per capita is $2,024 (PPP). Despite having $1 trillion or more in mineral deposits, it remains one of the world's least developed countries. Afghanistan's rough physical geography and its landlocked status has been cited as reasons why the country has always been among the least developed in the modern era – a factor where progress is also slowed by contemporary conflict and political instability. The country imports over $7 billion worth of goods but exports only $784 million, mainly fruits and nuts. It has $2.8 billion in external debt. The service sector contributed the most to the GDP (55.9%) followed by agriculture (23%) and industry (21.1%).

While the nation's current account deficit is largely financed with donor money, only a small portion is provided directly to the government budget. The rest is provided to non-budgetary expenditure and donor-designated projects through the United Nations system and non-governmental organizations.

Da Afghanistan Bank serves as the central bank of the nation and the Afghani (AFN) is the national currency, with an exchange rate of about 75 Afghanis to 1 US dollar. A number of local and foreign banks operate in the country, including the Afghanistan International Bank, New Kabul Bank, Azizi Bank, Pashtany Bank, Standard Chartered Bank, and the First Micro Finance Bank.

One of the main drivers for the current economic recovery is the return of over 5 million expatriates, who brought with them entrepreneurship and wealth-creating skills as well as much needed funds to start up businesses. Many Afghans are now involved in construction, which is one of the largest industries in the country. Some of the major national construction projects include the $35 billion New Kabul City next to the capital, the Aino Mena project in Kandahar, and the Ghazi Amanullah Khan Town near Jalalabad. Similar development projects have also begun in Herat, Mazar-e-Sharif, and other cities. An estimated 400,000 people enter the labor market each year.

Several small companies and factories began operating in different parts of the country, which not only provide revenues to the government but also create new jobs. Improvements to the business environment have resulted in more than $1.5 billion in telecom investment and created more than 100,000 jobs since 2003. Afghan rugs are becoming popular again, allowing many carpet dealers around the country to hire more workers; in 2016–17 it was the fourth most exported group of items.

Afghanistan is a member of WTO, SAARC, ECO, and OIC. It holds an observer status in SCO. In 2018, a majority of imports come from either Iran, China, Pakistan and Kazakhstan, while 84% of exports are to Pakistan and India.

Since the Taliban's takeover of the country in August 2021, the United States has frozen about $9 billion in assets belonging to the Afghan central bank, blocking the Taliban from accessing billions of dollars held in US bank accounts.

Agriculture

Agricultural production is the backbone of Afghanistan's economy and has traditionally dominated the economy, employing about 40% of the workforce as of 2018. The country is known for producing pomegranates, grapes, apricots, melons, and several other fresh and dry fruits. It is also known as the world's largest producer of opium – as much as 16% or more of the nation's economy is derived from the cultivation and sale of opium. It is also one of the world's top producers of cannabis.

Saffron, the most expensive spice, grows in Afghanistan, particularly Herat Province. In recent years, there has been an uptick in saffron production, which authorities and farmers trying to replace poppy cultivation. Between 2012 and 2019, the saffron cultivated and produced in Afghanistan was consecutively ranked the world's best by the International Taste and Quality Institute. Production hit record high in 2019 (19,469 kg of saffron), and one kilogram is sold domestically between $634 and $1147.

The availability of cheap diesel-powered water pumps imported from China and Pakistan, and in the 2010s, of cheap solar power to pump water, resulted in expansion of agriculture and population in the southwestern deserts of Afghanistan in Kandahar Province, Helmand Province and Nimruz Province in the 2010s. Wells have gradually been deepened, but water resources are limited. Opium is the major crop, but as of 2022, was under attack by the new Taliban government which, in order to suppress opium production, was systematically suppressing water pumping.

Mining 

The country's natural resources include: coal, copper, iron ore, lithium, uranium, rare earth elements, chromite, gold, zinc, talc, barite, sulfur, lead, marble, precious and semi-precious stones, natural gas, and petroleum. In 2010, US and Afghan government officials estimated that untapped mineral deposits located in 2007 by the US Geological Survey are worth at least .

Michael E. O'Hanlon of the Brookings Institution estimated that if Afghanistan generates about $10 billion per year from its mineral deposits, its gross national product would double and provide long-term funding for Afghan security forces and other critical needs. In 2011, Afghanistan signed an oil exploration contract with China National Petroleum Corporation (CNPC) for the development of three oil fields along the Amu Darya river in the north.

The country has significant amounts of lithium, copper, gold, coal, iron ore, and other minerals. The Khanashin carbonatite in Helmand Province contains  of rare earth elements. In 2007, a 30-year lease was granted for the Aynak copper mine to the China Metallurgical Group for $3 billion, making it the biggest foreign investment and private business venture in Afghanistan's history. The state-run Steel Authority of India won the mining rights to develop the huge Hajigak iron ore deposit in central Afghanistan. Government officials estimate that 30% of the country's untapped mineral deposits are worth at least . One official asserted that "this will become the backbone of the Afghan economy" and a Pentagon memo stated that Afghanistan could become the "Saudi Arabia of lithium". The lithium reserves of 21 Mio. tons could amount to the ones of Bolivia, which is currently viewed as the country with the largest lithium reserves. Other larger deposits are the ones of bauxite and cobalt. In a 2011 news story, the CSM reported, "The United States and other Western nations that have borne the brunt of the cost of the Afghan war have been conspicuously absent from the bidding process on Afghanistan's mineral deposits, leaving it mostly to regional powers."

Access to biocapacity in Afghanistan is lower than world average. In 2016, Afghanistan had 0.43 global hectares of biocapacity per person within its territory, much less than the world average of 1.6 global hectares per person. In 2016 Afghanistan used 0.73 global hectares of biocapacity per person - their ecological footprint of consumption. This means they use just under double as much biocapacity as Afghanistan contains. As a result, Afghanistan is running a biocapacity deficit.

Infrastructure

Energy

According to the World Bank, 98% of the rural population have access to electricity in 2018, up from 28% in 2008. Overall the figure stands at 98.7%. As of 2016, Afghanistan produces 1,400 megawatts of power, but still imports the majority of electricity via transmission lines from Iran and the Central Asian states. The majority of electricity production is via hydropower, helped by the amount of rivers and streams that flow from the mountains. However electricity is not always reliable and blackouts happen, including in Kabul. In recent years an increasing number of solar, biomass and wind power plants have been constructed. Currently under development are the CASA-1000 project which will transmit electricity from Kyrgyzstan and Tajikistan, and the Turkmenistan-Afghanistan-Pakistan-India (TAPI) gas pipeline. Power is managed by the Da Afghanistan Breshna Sherkat (DABS, Afghanistan Electricity Company).

Important dams include the Kajaki Dam, Dahla Dam, and the Sardeh Band Dam.

Tourism 

Tourism is a small industry in Afghanistan due to security issues. Nevertheless, some 20,000 foreign tourists visit the country annually as of 2016. In particular an important region for domestic and international tourism is the picturesque Bamyan Valley, which includes lakes, canyons and historical sites, helped by the fact it is in a safe area away from insurgent activity. Smaller numbers visit and trek in regions such as the Wakhan Valley, which is also one of the world's most remote communities. From the late 1960s onwards, Afghanistan was a popular stop on the famous hippie trail, attracting many Europeans and Americans. Coming from Iran, the trail traveled through various Afghan provinces and cities including Herat, Kandahar and Kabul before crossing to northern Pakistan, northern India, and Nepal. Tourism peaked in 1977, the year before the start of political instability and armed conflict.

The city of Ghazni has significant history and historical sites, and together with Bamyan city have in recent years been voted Islamic Cultural Capital and South Asia Cultural Capital respectively. The cities of Herat, Kandahar, Balkh, and Zaranj are also very historic. The Minaret of Jam in the Hari River valley is a UNESCO World Heritage Site. A cloak reputedly worn by Islam's prophet Muhammad is kept inside the Shrine of the Cloak in Kandahar, a city founded by Alexander the Great and the first capital of Afghanistan. The citadel of Alexander in the western city of Herat has been renovated in recent years and is a popular attraction. In the north of the country is the Shrine of Ali, believed by many to be the location where Ali was buried. The National Museum of Afghanistan is located in Kabul and hosts a large number of Buddhist, Bactrian Greek and early Islamic antiquities; the museum suffered greatly by civil war but has been slowly restoring since the early 2000s.

Communication 

Telecommunication services in Afghanistan are provided by Afghan Telecom, Afghan Wireless, Etisalat, MTN Group, and Roshan. The country uses its own space satellite called Afghansat 1, which provides services to millions of phone, internet, and television subscribers. By 2001 following years of civil war, telecommunications was virtually a non-existent sector, but by 2016 it had grown to a $2 billion industry, with 22 million mobile phone subscribers and 5 million internet users. The sector employs at least 120,000 people nationwide.

Transportation 

Due to Afghanistan's geography, transport between various parts of the country has historically been difficult.

The Ring Road is crucially important for domestic and international trade and the economy. A key portion of the Ring Road is the Salang Tunnel, completed in 1964, which facilitates travel through the Hindu Kush mountain range and connects northern and southern Afghanistan. It is the only land route that connects Central Asia to the Indian subcontinent. Several mountain passes allow travel between the Hindu Kush in other areas. Serious traffic accidents are common on Afghan roads and highways, particularly on the Kabul–Kandahar and the Kabul–Jalalabad Road. Traveling by bus in Afghanistan remains dangerous due to militant activities.

Air transport in Afghanistan is provided by the national carrier, Ariana Afghan Airlines, and by the private company Kam Air. Airlines from a number of countries also provide flights in and out of the country. These include Air India, Emirates, Gulf Air, Iran Aseman Airlines, Pakistan International Airlines, and Turkish Airlines. The country has four international airports: Hamid Karzai International Airport (formerly Kabul International Airport), Kandahar International Airport, Herat International Airport, and Mazar-e Sharif International Airport. Including domestic airports, there are 43. Bagram Air Base is a major military airfield.

These lines are used for freight only and there is no passenger service. A rail line between Khaf, Iran and Herat, western Afghanistan, intended for both freight and passengers, is under construction as of 2019. About  of the line will lie on the Afghan side. There are various proposals for the construction of additional rail lines in the country.

Private vehicle ownership has increased substantially since the early 2000s. Taxis are yellow in color and consist of both cars and auto rickshaws. In rural Afghanistan, villagers often use donkeys, mules or horses to transport or carry goods. Camels are primarily used by the Kochi nomads. Bicycles are popular throughout Afghanistan.

Culture 

Afghans have both common cultural features and those that differ between the regions of Afghanistan, each with distinctive cultures partly as a result of geographic obstacles that divide the country. Family is the mainstay of Afghan society and families are often headed by a patriarch. In the southern and eastern region, the people live according to the Pashtun culture by following Pashtunwali (the Pashtun way). Key tenets of Pashtunwali include hospitality, the provision of sanctuary to those seeking refuge, and revenge for the shedding of blood. The Pashtuns are largely connected to the culture of Central Asia and the Iranian Plateau. The remaining Afghans are culturally Persian and Turkic. Some non-Pashtuns who live in proximity with Pashtuns have adopted Pashtunwali in a process called Pashtunization, while some Pashtuns have been Persianized. Those who have lived in Pakistan and Iran over the last 30 years have been further influenced by the cultures of those neighboring nations. The Afghan people are known to be strongly religious.

Afghans, particularly Pashtuns, are noted for their tribal solidarity and high regard for personal honor. One writer considers the tribal system to be the best way of organizing large groups of people in a country that is geographically difficult, and in a society that, from a materialistic point of view, has an uncomplicated lifestyle. There are various Afghan tribes, and an estimated 2–3 million nomads. Afghan culture is deeply Islamic, but pre-Islamic practices persist. One example is bacha bazi, a term for activities involving sexual relations between older men and younger adolescent men, or boys. Child marriage is prevalent in Afghanistan; the legal age for marriage is 16. The most preferred marriage in Afghan society is to one's parallel cousin, and the groom is often expected to pay a bride price.

In the villages, families typically occupy mudbrick houses, or compounds with mudbrick or stone walled houses. Villages typically have a headman (malik), a master for water distribution (mirab) and a religious teacher (mullah). Men would typically work on the fields, joined by women during harvest. About 15% of the population are nomadic, locally called kochis. When nomads pass villages they often buy supplies such as tea, wheat and kerosene from the villagers; villagers buy wool and milk from the nomads.

Afghan clothing for both men and women typically consists of various forms of shalwar kameez, especially perahan tunban and khet partug. Women would normally wear a chador for head covering; some women, typically from highly conservative communities, wear the burqa, a full body covering. These were worn by some women of the Pashtun community well before Islam came to the region, but the Taliban enforced this dress on women when they were in power. Another popular dress is the chapan which acts as a coat. The karakul is a hat made from the fur of a specific regional breed of sheep. It was favored by former kings of Afghanistan and became known to much of the world in the 21st century when it was constantly worn by President Hamid Karzai. The pakol is another traditional hat originating from the far east of the country; it was popularly worn by the guerrilla leader Ahmad Shah Massoud. The Mazari hat originates from northern Afghanistan.

Architecture

The nation has a complex history that has survived either in its current cultures or in the form of various languages and monuments. Afghanistan contains many remnants from all ages, including Greek and Buddhist stupas, monasteries, monuments, temples and Islamic minarets. Among the most well known are the Great Mosque of Herat, the Blue Mosque, the Minaret of Jam, the Chil Zena, the Qala-i Bost in Lashkargah, the ancient Greek city of Ai-Khanoum. However, many of its historic monuments have been damaged in modern times due to the civil wars. The two famous Buddhas of Bamiyan were destroyed by the Taliban, who regarded them as idolatrous. Despite that, archaeologists are still finding Buddhist relics in different parts of the country, some of them dating back to the 2nd century. As there was no colonialism in the modern era in Afghanistan, European-style architecture is rare but does exist: the Victory Arch at Paghman and the Darul Aman Palace in Kabul were built in this style in the 1920s by the Afghans themselves.

Art and ceramics

Carpet weaving is an ancient practice in Afghanistan, and many of these are still handmade by tribal and nomadic people today. Carpets have been produced in the region for thousands of years and traditionally done by women. Some crafters express their feelings through the designs of rugs; for example after the outbreak of the Soviet–Afghan War, "war rugs", a variant of Afghan rugs, were created with designs representing pain and misery caused by the conflict. Every province has its own specific characteristics in making rugs. In some of the Turkic-populated areas in the north-west, bride and wedding ceremony prices are driven by the bride's weaving skills.

Pottery has been crafted in Afghanistan for millennia. The village of Istalif, north of Kabul, is in particular a major center, known for its unique turquoise and green pottery, and their methods of crafting have remained the same for centuries. Much of lapis lazuli stones were earthed in modern-day Afghanistan which were used in Chinese porcelain as cobalt blue, later used in ancient Mesopotamia and Turkey.

The lands of Afghanistan have a long history of art, with the world's earliest known usage of oil painting found in cave murals in the country. A notable art style that developed in Afghanistan and eastern Pakistan is Gandhara Art, produced by a fusion of Greco-Roman art and Buddhist art between the 1st and 7th centuries CE. Later eras saw increased use of the Persian miniature style, with Kamaleddin Behzad of Herat being one of the most notable miniature artists of the Timurid and early Safavid periods. Since the 1900s, the nation began to use Western techniques in art. Abdul Ghafoor Breshna was a prominent Afghan painter and sketch artist from Kabul during the 20th century.

Media and entertainment 

Afghanistan has around 350 radio stations and over 200 television stations. Radio Television Afghanistan, originating from 1925, is the state public broadcaster. Television programs began airing in the 1970s and today there are many private television channels such as TOLO and Shamshad TV. The first Afghan newspaper was published in 1873, and there are hundreds of print outlets today. By the 1920s, Radio Kabul was broadcasting local radio services. Voice of America, BBC, and Radio Free Europe/Radio Liberty (RFE/RL) broadcast in both of Afghanistan's official languages on radio. Press restrictions have been gradually relaxed and private media diversified since 2002, after more than two decades of tight controls.

Afghans have long been accustomed to watching Indian Bollywood films and listening to its filmi songs. It has been claimed that Afghanistan is among the biggest markets for the Hindi film industry. The stereotypes of Afghans in India (Kabuliwala or Pathani) have also been represented in some Bollywood films by actors. Many Bollywood film stars have roots in Afghanistan, including Salman Khan, Saif Ali Khan, Aamir Khan, Feroz Khan, Kader Khan, Naseeruddin Shah, Zarine Khan, Celina Jaitly, and a number of others. Several Bollywood films have been shot inside Afghanistan, including Dharmatma, Khuda Gawah, Escape from Taliban, and Kabul Express.

Music

Afghan classical music has close historical links with Indian classical music and use the same Hindustani terminology and theories like raga. Genres of this style of music include ghazal (poetic music) and instruments such as the Indian tabla, sitar and harmonium, and local instruments like zerbaghali, as well as dayereh and tanbur which are also known in Central Asia, the Caucasus and the Middle East. The rubab is the country's national instrument and precurses the Indian sarod instrument. Some of the famous artists of classical music include Ustad Sarahang and Sarban.

Pop music developed in the 1950s through Radio Kabul and was influential in social change. During this time female artists also started appearing, at first Mermon Parwin. Perhaps the most famous artist of this genre was Ahmad Zahir, who synthesized many genres and continues to be renowned for his voice and rich lyrics long after his death in 1979. Other notable masters of traditional or popular Afghan music include Nashenas, Ubaidullah Jan, Mahwash, Ahmad Wali, Farhad Darya, and Naghma.

Attan is the national dance of Afghanistan, a group dance popularly performed by Afghans of all backgrounds. The dance is considered part of Afghan identity.

Cuisine 

Afghan cuisine is largely based upon the nation's chief crops, such as wheat, maize, barley and rice. Accompanying these staples are native fruits and vegetables as well as dairy products such as milk, yogurt and whey. Kabuli palaw is the national dish of Afghanistan. The nation's culinary specialties reflect its ethnic and geographic diversity. Afghanistan is known for its high-quality pomegranates, grapes, and sweet melons. Tea is a favorite drink among Afghans, and a typical diet consists of naan, yoghurt, rice and meat.

Literature 

Classic Persian and Pashto poetry are a cherished part of Afghan culture. Poetry has always been one of the major educational pillars in the region, to the level that it has integrated itself into culture. One of the poetic styles is called landay. A popular theme in Afghan folklore and mythology are Divs, monstrous creatures. Thursdays are traditionally "poetry night" in the city of Herat when men, women and children gather and recite both ancient and modern poems.

The Afghan region has produced countless Persian-speaking poets and writers from the Middle Ages to the present day, among which three mystical authors are considered true national glories (although claimed with equal ardor by Iran), namely: Khwaja Abdullah Ansari of Herat, a great mystic and Sufi saint in the 11th century, Sanai of Ghazni, author of mystical poems in the 12th century, and, finally, Rumi of Balkh, in the 13th century, considered the persophonist throughout the world as the greatest mystical poet of the entire Muslim world. The Afghan Pashto literature, although quantitatively remarkable and in great growth in the last century, has always had an essentially local meaning and importance, feeling the influence of both Persian literature and the contiguous literatures of India. Both main literatures, from the second half of the nineteenth century, have shown themselves to be sensitive to genres (novel, theater), movements and stylistic features imported from Europe.

Khushal Khan Khattak of the 17th century is considered the national poet. Other notable poets include Rabi'a Balkhi, Jami, Rahman Baba, Khalilullah Khalili, and Parween Pazhwak.

Holidays and festivals

Afghanistan's official New Year starts with Nowruz, an ancient tradition that started as a Zoroastrian celebration in present-day Iran, and with which it shares the annual celebration along with several other countries. It occurs every year at the vernal equinox. In Afghanistan, Nowruz is typically celebrated with music and dance, as well as holding buzkashi tournaments.

Yaldā, another nationally celebrated ancient tradition, commemorates the ancient goddess Mithra and marks the longest night of the year on the eve of the winter solstice (usually falling on 20 or 21 December), during which families gather together to recite poetry and eat fruits—particularly the red fruits watermelon and pomegranate, as well as mixed nuts.

Religious festivals are also celebrated; as a predominantly Muslim country, Islamic events and festivals such as Ramadan, Eid al-Fitr and Ashura are widely celebrated annually in Afghanistan. The Sikh festival of Vaisakhi is celebrated by the Sikh community and the Hindu festival Diwali by the Hindu community.

National Independence Day is celebrated on 19 August to mark the Anglo-Afghan Treaty of 1919 under King Amanullah Khan and the country's full independence. Several international celebrations are also officially held in Afghanistan, such as International Workers' Day and International Women's Day. Some regional festivals include the Pamir Festival, which celebrates the culture of the Wakhi and Kyrgyz peoples, the Red Flower Festival (during Nowruz) in Mazar-i-Sharif and the Damboora Festival in Bamyan Province.

Sports 

Sport in Afghanistan is managed by the Afghan Sports Federation. Cricket and Association football are the two most popular sports in the country. The Afghan Sports Federation promotes cricket, association football, basketball, volleyball, golf, handball, boxing, taekwondo, weightlifting, bodybuilding, track and field, skating, bowling, snooker, chess, and other sports.

Afghanistan's sports teams are increasingly celebrating titles at international events. basketball team won the first team sports title at the 2010 South Asian Games. Later that year, the country's cricket team followed it with the winning of 2009–10 ICC Intercontinental Cup. In 2012, the country's 3x3 basketball team won the gold medal at the 2012 Asian Beach Games. In 2013, Afghanistan's football team followed as it won the SAFF Championship.

The Afghan national cricket team, which was formed in 2001, participated in the 2009 ICC World Cup Qualifier, 2010 ICC World Cricket League Division One and the 2010 ICC World Twenty20. It won the ACC Twenty20 Cup in 2007, 2009, 2011 and 2013. The team eventually made it and played in the 2015 Cricket World Cup. The Afghanistan Cricket Board (ACB) is the official governing body of the sport and is headquartered in Kabul. The Alokozay Kabul International Cricket Ground serves as the nation's main cricket stadium. There are several other stadiums throughout the country, including the Ghazi Amanullah Khan International Cricket Stadium near Jalalabad. Domestically, cricket is played between teams from different provinces.

The Afghanistan national football team has been competing in international football since 1941. The national team plays its home games at the Ghazi Stadium in Kabul, while football in Afghanistan is governed by the Afghanistan Football Federation. The national team has never competed or qualified for the FIFA World Cup but has recently won an international football trophy in 2013. The country also has a national team in the sport of futsal, a 5-a-side variation of football.

The traditional and the national sport of Afghanistan is buzkashi, mainly popular in the north, but also having a following in other parts of the country. It is similar to polo, played by horsemen in two teams, each trying to grab and hold a goat carcass. The Afghan Hound (a type of running dog) originated in Afghanistan and was formerly used in wolf hunting. In 2002, traveler Rory Stewart reported that dogs were still used for wolf hunting in remote areas.

See also 

 Outline of Afghanistan

Explanatory notes

References

Citations

General and cited sources

Further reading

External links 

 Afghanistan. The World Factbook. Central Intelligence Agency.
 
 
 
 Research Guide to Afghanistan

 
1709 establishments in Asia
Central Asian countries
Countries in Asia
Emirates
Iranian Plateau
Islamic states
Landlocked countries
Least developed countries
Member states of the Organisation of Islamic Cooperation
Member states of the South Asian Association for Regional Cooperation
Member states of the United Nations
Pashto-speaking countries and territories
Persian-speaking countries and territories
South Asian countries
States and territories established in 1709
States and territories established in 1747
Theocracies
Totalitarian states